Henry Lumley, Viscount Lumley (c. 1685 – 24 April 1710), of Stansted Park, Sussex and Lumley Castle, county Durham, was a  British Whig politician who sat in the House of Commons from 1708 to 1710.

Lumley was the eldest son of Richard Lumley, 1st Earl of Scarbrough and his wife Frances Jones, daughter of Sir Henry Jones of Aston, Oxfordshire. He was educated at Eton College in 1698 and matriculated from  King's College, Cambridge at Easter 1703. He became a Captain in the 1st Dragoon Guards in 1708.

Lumley was returned as Whig Member of Parliament for Arundel, near the family estates in Sussex, at a by-election on 7 December 1708. Early in 1710, he voted for the impeachment of Dr Sacheverell. His career was cut short due to his death by smallpox in 1710.

Lumley died unmarried on 24 April 1710 and was buried at St Martin-in-the-Fields. He was extremely small in stature, and was even referred to as a ‘pigmy’ by one contemporary. Alexander Pope, another small man, expressed regret on the death of Lumley, whom he considered a hero.

References

 

1680s births
1710 deaths
People educated at Eton College
Alumni of King's College, Cambridge
Members of the Parliament of Great Britain for English constituencies
Deaths from smallpox
British MPs 1708–1710
People from Stoughton, West Sussex
British courtesy viscounts
Heirs apparent who never acceded